FC Olimpia Gelendzhik is a Russian football team from Gelendzhik, founded in 2011. It played in the Russian Second Division in the 2011/12 season, taking 14th place in Zone South. It withdrew from the professional competitions after the season.

Notes and references

External links
  Official website

Association football clubs established in 2011
Football clubs in Russia
Sport in Krasnodar Krai
2011 establishments in Russia